Full House is a 1980 album by British pop group The Dooleys. It included the singles "Love Patrol", "Body Language", "In a Riddle" and the UK top ten hit "The Chosen Few" among its 16 tracks. It was produced by Ben Findon.

Overview 
This was the group's third studio album and featured the singles "Love Patrol", "Body Language" and "In a Riddle". As well as this, top 10 hit "Chosen Few" was added to the album, despite it being featured on the group's previous album, The Chosen Few. In fact, most of the previous album's songs appeared on this 16-track collection. This cost-cutting measure was a disappointment to fans expecting an album of new songs. However, seven of the tracks were new, although these included the three already-released singles and some cover versions. The only two completely new and original songs out of the 16 were "I Spy" - a song written by the group themselves and one that had been released as a single in Japan - and "Meet Me Halfway". As well as this, the previously released track "Whispers" was included here in a newly recorded version (although had appeared as a B-side to "Body Language").

The album's chart position was marginally improved on the previous album, reaching No.54 (two places higher), but "Body Language" was their last regular hit single. In Japan however, their success continued with "Body Language" becoming their second number one. Another album was released there around this time titled Pop Fantasia, which while including some tracks recycled from here and from B-sides, it featured four tracks never released in the UK: "Only the Music's Changed" (also released as a single), "How Am I Ever Gonna Live it Down", "Situation Vacant" and "A Little Bit Special".

In May 2013 Full House was released on Compact disc for the first time by Cherry Red Records. This was in a double-pack with the group's follow-up album, Secrets. This included a number of bonus tracks including three B-side-only songs from this period. The second disc featured three of the four Japan-only tracks. (Only "Situation Vacation" was not included on the CD.)

Track listing 

Side one
 "Love Patrol" (Findon / Myers / Puzey) 2.41
 "Growing Pains" (Findon / Myers) 3.24
 "Let's Make Believe" (Findon / Myers / Puzey) 3.56
 "Operator" (Spivery) 3.05
 "Don't Turn the Feeling Down" (Findon / Myers / Puzey) 2.50
 "You Bring Out the Best in Me" (Findon / Myers) 4.19
 "One Kiss Away" (Findon / Charles) 2.42
 "I Spy" (The Dooleys) 3.05

Side two
 "Body Language" (Findon / Myers / Puzey) 2.59
 "Chosen Few" (Findon) 3.08
 "Whispers" (Findon / Myers / Puzey) 2.54
 "Don't Cry for Me Argentina" (Lloyd-Webber / Rice) 4.34
 "Now That the Party is Over" (Findon / Myers / Puzey) 3.31
 "Love" (Findon / Anthony) 3.06
 "Meet Me Halfway" (Findon / Myers / Puzey) 4.10
 "In a Riddle" (Findon / Myers / Puzey) 3.19

CD Bonus tracks
 "Once Upon a Happy Ending"(The Dooleys) 3.43 [non-LP B-side, UK, 1980]
 "Sign of the Times" (Dixie / Dooley / Myers) 3.12 [non-LP B-side, UK, 1980]
 "Going Solo" (Dixie / Dooley / Myers) 3.04 [non-LP B-side, UK, 1980]
 "Stand Up Like a Man" (Findon / Myers) 4.10 [from 'Best of The Dooleys' LP, UK, 1979]
 "Sad Old Spanish Guitar" (Findon / Puzey) 3.12 [from 'Best of The Dooleys' LP, UK, 1979]
 "Body Language (Extended Version)" (Findon / Myers / Puzey) 5.19 [12-inch single, Japan, 1980]

Personnel 
 Jim Dooley - Vocals
 John Dooley - Guitar
 Frank Dooley - Guitar
 Anne Dooley - Vocals
 Kathy Dooley - Vocals
 Helen Dooley - Keyboards
 Bob Walsh - Bass
 Alan Bogan - Drums
 Ben Findon - Producer
 Mike Myers - Assistant producer
 "Dixie" John Taggart - Musical director
 George Nicholson and Simon Wakefield - Engineers
 Seabrook Graves & Aslett - Sleeve design
 Ian Leary - Sleeve concept 
 Derek Aslett - Sleeve photography

References 

The Dooleys albums
1980 albums
GTO Records albums